ROTG may refer to:

Rise of the Gargoyles, a 2009 horror television film
Rise of the Guardians, a 2012 fantasy film